A Means to an End: The Music of Joy Division is a tribute album, featuring various artists covering the songs of Joy Division. It was released in 1995 by Virgin Records.

Track listing

References

External links 

 The Tech review

Joy Division tribute albums
1995 compilation albums
Post-punk compilation albums
Alternative rock compilation albums
Virgin Records compilation albums